Streptomyces auratus is a bacterium species from the genus Streptomyces. Streptomyces auratus produces neophoslactomycin A, lysolipins I and lysolipins X.

See also 
 List of Streptomyces species

References

Further reading

External links
Type strain of Streptomyces auratus at BacDive -  the Bacterial Diversity Metadatabase

auratus
Bacteria described in 2008